Orthops montanus is a species of plant bugs belonging to the family Miridae, subfamily Mirinae that can be found in Albania, Austria, Bulgaria, Czech Republic, Liechtenstein, Poland, Romania, Slovakia, Switzerland, Ukraine, Western Europe (except for Scandinavia) and all states of former Yugoslavia (except for Bosnia and Herzegovina).

References

Insects described in 1837
Hemiptera of Europe
Mirini